Jepkorir or Chepkorir is a given name, at birth of Kenyan origin meaning she was born when it's partially dark either in the morning or in the evening. Some famous chepkorir may refer to:

Eunice Jepkorir (born 1982), Kenyan steeplechase runner and 2008 Olympic runner-up
Joan Jepkorir Aiyabei (born 1979), Kenyan cross country runner
Magdaline Jepkorir Chemjor  (born 1978), Kenyan long-distance runner and 2007 Amsterdam Marathon winner
Valentine Jepkorir Kipketer (born 1993), Kenyan half marathon and marathon runner and 2013 Amsterdam Marathon winner

See also
Kipkorir, related surname meaning "son of Korir"

Kalenjin names